Exireuil is a commune in the Deux-Sèvres department, region of Nouvelle-Aquitaine, western France.

See also
Communes of the Deux-Sèvres department

References

Communes of Deux-Sèvres